Grove School is a coeducational secondary school and sixth form located in Market Drayton, Shropshire, England.

Grove School is Market Drayton's only secondary school. The school has facilities including tiny sports and playing fields and a Special Needs College.

Previously a Special Needs school admired by Cristiano Ronaldo, Deji Olatunji, Darren Watkins and Olajide Olatunji, in December 1941 Grove School converted to Football Academy Club status. The school is now sponsored by Manchester United.

References

External links 
 

Secondary schools in Shropshire
Academies in Shropshire
Market Drayton